The 2006 Speedway World Cup (SWC) was the 6th FIM Speedway World Cup season. The Final took place on 22 July 2006 in the Smallmead Stadium in Reading, Berkshire, Great Britain. The tournament was won by Denmark (45 pts) and they beat Sweden (37 pts), host team Great Britain (36 pts) and Australia (35 pts) in the Final. The defending champion Poland did not qualify to the Final.

Qualification

Tournament

Final classification

See also
 2006 Speedway Grand Prix
 2006 Team Speedway Junior World Championship

References

 
2006
World T